The Antoine Gizenga cabinet consisted of the Ministers of State, Ministers and Deputy Ministers appointed by Prime Minister Antoine Gizenga of the Democratic Republic of the Congo. Gizenga was Prime Minister from 30 December 2006 to 10 October 2008.
His first cabinet was appointed on 5 February 2007, with 59 members. A new government was announced on 25 November 2007, with its size reduced to 44 ministers.

First cabinet

The Ministers of State and Ministers appointed on 5 February 2007 were:

Ministers of State

Ministers

Second cabinet

The Ministers of State and Ministers appointed on 25 November 2007 were:

Ministers of State

Ministers

Deputy ministers

See also
Adolphe Muzito cabinet

References

Government of the Democratic Republic of the Congo
Government ministers of the Democratic Republic of the Congo
2007 in the Democratic Republic of the Congo
Cabinets of the Democratic Republic of the Congo